Macrotermes gilvus is a species of termite in the family Termitidae, found in Cambodia, East Timor, India, Indonesia, Malaysia, Myanmar, Philippines, Singapore, Thailand and Vietnam.

References

External links

Termites
Insects of Asia
Taxa named by Hermann August Hagen
Insects described in 1858